Armand Batlle (born 12 April 1987) is a French rugby union player. His position is Wing and he currently plays for Castres Olympique in the Top 14.

Honours

Club 
 Castres
Top 14: 2017–18

References

External links 
 

1987 births
Living people
French rugby union players
US Colomiers players
Sportspeople from Perpignan
USA Perpignan players
Rugby union wings
FC Grenoble players
Castres Olympique players